John Graham Knatchbull (bapt. 24 January 1793 – 13 February 1844) was an English naval captain and convict found guilty of murder in 1844.  He was one of the earliest to raise in a British court the plea of moral insanity (unsuccessfully).

Biography 

Knatchbull was born in Mersham, Kent, England, likely the son of Sir Edward Knatchbull, 8th Baronet of Mersham Hatch, and  his second wife, Frances Graham. His father had 20 children by three wives.

He attended Winchester College and volunteered for the navy in 1804 serving until 1818 and rising to the rank of Captain. He served aboard the Ardent, Revenge, Zealand, Sybille, Téméraire, Leonidas, Cumberland, Ocean and Ajax. In November 1810 he passed his lieutenant's examination, then served aboard Sheerwater until August 1812 when he was invalided home; then aboard HMS Benbow and HMS Queen. In December 1813 he was commissioned to command HMS Doterell, but missed the ship and was reappointed in September 1814. After the Battle of Waterloo in June 1815, the navy was reduced and Knatchbull retired on full pay until March 1818, when his pay was stopped by the Admiralty because of a debt he had incurred in the Azores.

Transportation 

In August 1824 he was found guilty of stealing with force and arms at the Surrey Assizes under the name of John Fitch. Knatchbull was given a 14-year sentence and transported to New South Wales on the Asia.

In New South Wales he was assigned to Bathurst.  He was given a ticket of leave in 1829 after apprehending eight runaways. His ticket was altered to Liverpool when he became an overseer on the Parramatta Road. On 31 December 1831 he was charged with forging Judge Dowling's signature to a cheque on the Bank of Australia; he was found guilty and sentenced to death in 1832. This sentence was commuted to transportation for seven years to Norfolk Island.

While on Norfolk Island, he took part in two mutinies. En route to Norfolk Island in 1832 Knatchbull conspired with other convicts on board ship to poison the crews' and guards' food with arsenic. The mutineers were informed on and the arsenic was found, but it was seen as too much trouble to return the prisoners to the mainland for trial and they became known among their fellow convicts as "Tea-Sweeteners". In the second mutiny of 1834 planned against the governor of the convict settlement and his deputy, Knatchbull escaped punishment by informing on his fellow mutineers.

While Knatchbull was on Norfolk Island, Thomas Atkins, an Independent clergyman who was sent to Norfolk Island as a chaplain in November 1836 on the recommendation of the London Missionary Society, said of Knatchbull from his personal appearance and conversation, as all traces of a gentleman had long disappeared, he exhibited no evidence that he had been in a higher social position; indeed he appeared to be in his natural place.

Knatchbull returned to Sydney in 1839 to serve out the remainder of his original sentence (the 14 years for stealing with force and arms).

Murder of Ellen Jamieson and death 

In January 1844 Knatchbull murdered shopkeeper Ellen Jamieson with a tomahawk while stealing money for his upcoming marriage. He was tried on 24 January and found guilty of murder and sentenced to be hanged.

During the early part of 1844, two murders of a very horrible character were committed in Sydney. In one case, a Norfolk Island expiree, who held a ticket of leave, had gone into the shop of a poor widow, named Ellen Jamieson, and asked for some trifling article. While Mrs. Jamieson was serving him, the ruffian raised a tomahawk, which he held in his hand, and clove the unfortunate woman's head in a savage manner. She lingered for a few days, and died, leaving two orphan children. The murderer, whose name was John Knatchbull, was proved to have been a wretch of the most abominable description; and though an attempt was made to set up a plea of insanity, a barrister being employed by the agent for the suppression of capital punishment, so foul a villain could not be saved from the gallows. It is gratifying to add, that Sir Edward Knatchbull, the brother of the criminal, has sent out a handsome donation for the orphans of Mrs. Jamieson.

Knatchbull's defence was conducted by Robert Lowe, later Viscount Sherbrooke.  Lowe argued on Knatchbull's behalf that insanity of the will could exist apart from insanity of the intellect. He argued that Knatchbull had yielded to an irresistible impulse and could not be held responsible for his crime. This was a novel defence for the time. The court, however, found Knatchbull guilty. The Lowes subsequently adopted the murdered woman's two young children, Bobby and Polly Jamieson. Knatchbull's brother provided money for the children's education.

Knatchbull appealed unsuccessfully on the grounds that the judge had not directed that his body be dissected and anatomized, as required by law. His hanging on 13 February 1844 occurred in Taylor Square and was witnessed by 10,000. John Knatchbull sentenced to hang for the murder of Ellen Jamieson: The execution to be held outside the gates of the three-year-old  [Darlinghurst] gaol, was scheduled for 9a.m. At the crack of dawn scores of people, children included, were swarming across the racecourse (Hyde Park) towards Darlinghurst Hill. The Australian newspaper judged the throng to be 10,000 strong. The paper was disdainful of the ghoulish mob yet, at the same time, congratulated them on their good behavior. Captain John Knatchbull aged 56 years, was led out into Forbes Street, at the gaol gates on the Darlinghurst Ridge.  Wearing genteel black broadcloth, Captain Knatchbull then "ascended the fatal scaffold without trepidation or fear, and was launched into another world with a noble and fervent prayer trembling on his lips". The bell of St Phillip's tolled thrice and John Knatchbull was dead.

See also
List of convicts transported to Australia

References 

1844 deaths
1790s births
People educated at Winchester College
Australian people convicted of murder
English people convicted of murder
Convicts transported to Australia
Executed people from Kent
Executed Australian people
People executed for murder
People executed by New South Wales
19th-century executions by Australia
People convicted of murder by New South Wales
People from Mersham
John
Year of birth uncertain
People executed by Australian colonies by hanging
1844 murders in Australia
Younger sons of baronets